Asteras Tripolis Football Club, commonly referred to as Asteras Tripolis (meaning "Star of Tripoli"), is a Greek professional football club based in the city of Tripoli in Arcadia, Peloponnese, Greece. Founded on 26 March 1931,their badge has Theodoros Kolokotronis on his horse and they have yellow and blue worn as home kit. Its home ground is the Theodoros Kolokotronis Stadium, a 7,442-capacity stadium in Tripoli.

In domestic football, Asteras Tripolis has been in Super League, the Greek top professional league, since the 2007–08 season. They were runners-up of the Greek Cup in 2013 and have reached the semi-finals of the competition overall four times.

Asteras Tripolis has also competed two seasons in the UEFA Europa League group stage and overall five seasons in the competition. The club is in 10th place between the 19 teams with contribution of points in European football for Greece.

History

Early years

Asteras Tripolis was founded in 1931, in the area near Tripoli's railway station and was formally recognised forthwith. However, the club stayed inactive and during 1932 all football clubs in Tripoli were temporarily dissolved. At the same time, Minas Tsavdaris founded a football club and named it "Keramikos" after his home area. Despite his efforts, Keramikos was never formally recognised, and in 1938 Tsavdaris decided to transfer all of the club's players to Asteras Tripolis, which was still legally recognised. This signified the revival of the club and Asteras Tripolis managed to compete in the inaugural season (1939–40) of the regional Arcadian League. However, the subsequent German occupation of Greece ended all league competitions abruptly and the club was dissolved once again.

Post-World War II

After World War II, Asteras Tripolis was reformed under the name "Neos Asteras" and was accordingly recognised by Tripoli's courts on 23 June 1947.  Asteras Tripolis won five consecutive titles in the Arcadian League (1957–62). The team won consecutive promotions and managed to play for two seasons in Second National Division (1961–63), thus becoming the first team from Tripoli to ever participate in such a high division. In the summer of 1963, Asteras Tripolis merged with Aris–Atromitos and the new team was named "Athlitikos Omilos Tripolis" (Athletic Club of Tripoli, AOT). AOT's function was based in Asteras Tripolis' statute and the new club continued its activities until 1968, when it was dissolved once again and was subsequently merged with Arkadikos to form Panarkadikos.

Recent history and era of success (2003–present)

Asteras Tripolis was reformed again in 1978.  The club participated in the regional Arcadian League until 2003. At 2001 the club entered a new era and led an outstanding streak of performances under the leadership of Dimitris Bakos and 
Giannis Kaimenakis. They remained unbeaten at home for over 5 years (from 2001 to November 2006) and they managed to move up four divisions, earning the promotion for the Super League Greece as Second Division champions on 12 May 2007.

Asteras Tripolis made a spectacular start in their first season in Super League, under the technical leadership of Paulo Campos. Their first ever win was against Panathinaikos (1–0 in Tripoli) and their first away win against OFI in Crete (3–0). The season was marked by some outstanding performances with the most memorable being the 1–0 home victory against champions Olympiacos. They also managed to win 2–1 against AEK Athens and 2–0 against PAOK at home. Asteras Tripolis became the first and only newly promoted Super League team that managed to beat Olympiacos, Panathinaikos, PAOK (home and away) and AEK Athens in its first ever appearance in the top division. It is remarkable that the team of that season made Asteras Tripolis popular in Greek fans as "Greek Boca" because of its Argentinian players (Lucio Filomeno, Horacio Cardozo, Mauro Milano, Israel Damonte etc.) and the mutual colours of the club with the famous Boca Juniors.

Coach Paulo Campos left Asteras Tripolis on 24 February 2008 with assistant manager Panagiotis Tzanavaras taking over for the rest of the 2007–08 season. Asteras Tripolis finally ended 7th, missing the European spot in the last games. In the summer of 2008, Asteras Tripolis announced Carlos Carvalhal as their new manager. He was sacked in mid-season due to poor results which led the team near the relegation zone. He was succeeded by former AEK Athens caretaker manager, Nikos Kostenoglou. Despite the unfortunate results in Super League, the team managed to remain focused on the goal of the Greek Cup, reaching the semi-finals for the first time in its history, where finally eliminated by Olympiacos. In 2009, Asteras Tripolis signed the Argentine former Internazionale assistant Mario Gómez as their new coach.

After a season with moderate results that led Asteras Tripolis to 12th place finish in Super League, the next season was coming to get worse the status of the club. In the 2010–11 season, after some wrong player choices and a disappointing 2nd round, Asteras Tripolis dealt relegation hammer blow. However, on 19 May 2011, the Disciplinary Committee of the competition found Iraklis guilty of forgery during the winter transfer window. Therefore the club was automatically put at the end of the league table and demoted to the Football League. This development resulted in Asteras Tripolis remaining in Super League.

In the 2011–12 season, Asteras Tripolis reached the 6th place and failed to qualify for the Play-offs. However, AEK Athens was not licensed to play in the 2012–13 Europa League and therefore replaced by the 6th placed team in the league table, Asteras Tripolis. That was the first participation of the club in UEFA competitions.
The season completed with another participation of the club in Greek Cup semi-finals, in which the team eliminated after an exciting 2nd leg match against Atromitos in Tripoli.

The 2012–13 season was one of the most memorable in Asteras Tripolis' history. The club competed in the UEFA Europa League second qualifying round and won its first qualification to a next round in European level, eliminating the Azerbaijani, Inter Baku.
In Super League, the club took a step ahead, finishing third(and fourth in the play-offs) and secured a place for the 2013–14 Europa League. However, the highlight of the season was the outstanding road of the team, under the technical leadership of Sakis Tsiolis,  to the first Greek Cup final in club's history. The "Arcadians" lost 1–3 against Olympiacos after extra time and as 13,000 supporters of the yellow-blues were at the Olympic Stadium of Athens.

In the 2014–15 season, Asteras Tripolis took another step ahead in European level, reaching the 2014–15 UEFA Europa League group stage for the first time in club's history, after a streak of qualifications against RoPS, Mainz 05 and Maccabi Tel Aviv. In the Group C, Asteras Tripolis won six points and finished third against Tottenham Hotspur, Beşiktaş and Partizan. In Super league, Asteras Tripolis finished in 3rd place, its highest place in the league table until these days. Also, the main striker of the squad, Jerónimo Barrales, emerged top goalscorer in 2014-15 Super League Greece.

In the next season, 2015–16, Asteras Tripolis secured his direct participation in the Europa League group stage as finished third in the 2014-15 Super League. In the Group K, the club won four points and finished third again, with rivals Schalke 04, Sparta Prague and APOEL. Although during the 2016-17 Super League season, Asteras Tripolis finished 12th, in the next season, the club finished fifth, securing a place in the second qualifying round of 2018–19 Europa League.

Crests and colours

Crests

The original crest of the club is the star symbol in the traditional colors of the team, yellow and blue. Over the following decades, different versions of the crest were introduced with minor changes. In 2006 first appeared the version that was coming to connect with the most recent glorious days of the club, until the summer of 2020. With the motto "The story has no end", the club presented the new crest on July 21, 2020. The star symbol is maintained in the highest position, as the symbol with which the club traveled through time, since 1931. Also, the new crest connects the club with the most special monument of its city, the statue of Theodoros Kolokotronis, the Greek general and pre-eminent leader of the Greek War of Independence. The statue, located in Areos Square since September 1971, was made to present Theodoros Kolokotronis in battle and his bones are kept there. At the same time, with the phrase "ET IN ARCADIA EGO" written on it, the new crest seals the relationship of the club with the whole of Arcadia.

Colours and kit evolution

First

Alternative

Kit manufacturers and shirt sponsors

Stadium

Theodoros Kolokotronis Stadium (formally Asteras Tripolis Stadium) is a privately owned football stadium in Tripoli, Greece. Its capacity is 7,600. The stadium was built in 1979. After the team's promotion in the Football League in 2005, the stadium was renovated and its capacity expanded, including the east stand, which also houses the club's offices, a gym and changing rooms, a lounge, etc. In 2007, with the rise of Asteras Tripolis in the Super League, the western theater was built, housing the journalists and VIP posts, and a small square on the south side was also added for use mainly by the fans of the hosted team. In 2008, the northern beam was constructed. In 2010, the southern beam was reconstructed and expanded. In 2015, on the occasion of the Asteras Tripolis team's participation in the Europa League (2015–16) groups, for the second time in its history and the second consecutive parallel but also the fourth consecutive year of the group's presence in general (the first two only in the qualifiers), several remarkable interventions were carried out on the stadium, mainly in its interior, such as changing rooms and the press room, etc.

On 27 November 2011, in the match between Asteras Tripolis and Olympiacos for the 11th season of the championship (2011–12), the spectators arrived at the stadium with 6,150 tickets.

The stadium was renamed on 22 November 2012 in honour of the hero of the Greek War of Independence, Theodoros Kolokotronis.

Also, the club has proposed a new stadium, the New Asteras Tripolis Stadium.

Domestic record

Divisional history
 15 seasons in Super League.
 3 seasons in Second Division.
 1 season in Third Division.
 5 seasons in Fourth Division.

Recent seasons

European record

UEFA club coefficient ranking
As of the end of the 2021-22 season

Source:

By season
Last update: As of the end of the 2021-22 season

Notes
 1R: First round
 2Q: Second qualifying round
 3Q: Third qualifying round
 PO: Play-off round

Notable wins

Honours

National
 Greek Cup
  Runners-up: 2012–13
 Beta Ethniki (Second Division)
 Winners: 2006–07
 Gamma Ethniki (Third Division)
 Winners: 2005–06
 Delta Ethniki (Fourth Division)
 Winners: 2004–05

Regional
 Arcadian Championship
 Winners (8): 1957–58, 1958–59, 1959–60, 1960–61, 1961–62, 1987–88, 1989–90, 2002–03
 Arcadian Cup
 Winners (4): 1988–89, 1989–90, 2003–04, 2004–05
 Arcadian Double
 Winners (1): 1989–90

Players

Current squad

Reserves and Academy

Other players under contract

Out on loan

Notable former players

The list includes footballers who have played at least 40 official matches for Asteras Tripolis. The total appearances and goals comprise those in Super League, Greek Cup, Football League Greece, Gamma Ethniki and UEFA Europa League.

Source:

1 Football League Greece as level 2 on pyramid of Greek football league system.

2 Gamma Ethniki as level 3 on pyramid of Greek football league system.

Affiliated clubs
 Villarreal
 Juventus

Personnel

Managerial history
 Giannis Petrakis (2004 – 6 January 2006)
 Lysandros Georgamlis (January 2006 – 6 May)
 Giannis Papakostas (June 2006 – 6 December)
 Paulo Campos (29 November 2006 – 2 February 2008)
 Panagiotis Tzanavaras (25 February 2008 – 13 May 2008)
 Carlos Carvalhal (14 May 2008 – 15 October 2008)
 Nikos Kostenoglou (20 November 2008 – 18 May 2009)
 Mario Gómez (1 July 2009 – 25 October 2009)
 Vangelis Vlachos (26 October 2009 – 17 January 2011)
 Pavlos Dermitzakis (21 January 2011 – 17 May 2011)
 Óscar Fernández (15 June 2011 – 19 September 2011)
 Horácio Gonçalves (19 September 2011 – 7 November 2011)
 Sakis Tsiolis (9 November 2011 – 30 September 2013)
 Staikos Vergetis (2 October 2013 – 29 January 2016)
 Dimitrios Terezopoulos (30 January 2016 – 28 February 2016)
 Makis Chavos (29 February 2016 – 26 September 2016)
 Dimitrios Eleftheropoulos (27 September 2016 – 18 February 2017)
 Apostolos Charalampidis (19 February 2016 – 8 March 2017)
 Staikos Vergetis (9 March 2017 – 10 September 2017)
 Savvas Pantelidis (10 September 2017 – 12 November 2018)
 Georgios Paraschos (12 November 2018 – 17 May 2019)
 Borja Jiménez (6 July 2019 – 4 December 2019)
 Milan Rastavac (5 December 2019 – 15 May 2022)
 Iraklis Metaxas (9 June 2022 – 23 December 2023)
 Akis Mantzios (4 January 2023 – Present)

See also
Tigers Ultras

References

External links

Official websites
 Official website 
 Asteras Tripolis at the Super League official website 
 Asteras Tripolis at the UEFA official website
 Asteras Tripolis at the FIFA official website
News sites
 Asteras Tripolis on arcadiasports.gr 
 Asteras Tripolis news from Nova Sports
Other
 Asteras Tripolis stadium at stadia.gr 

 
Association football clubs established in 1931
Tripoli, Greece
1931 establishments in Greece
Football clubs in Peloponnese (region)